Sikhs for Justice (SFJ) is a US-based secessionist group that supports the secession of Punjab from India as Khalistan. Founded and primarily headed by lawyer Gurpatwant Singh Pannun in 2009. The organization was created in response to the murders of Sikhs after Prime Minister, Indira Gandhi death by her Sikh bodyguards. The motivation for the assassination was due to the Prime Minister's decision to attack the Golden Temple in Amritsar. 

The events after the murder of the Prime Minister included the murders of around 3,000 Sikhs. The murderers did not stop after the assassination, the government implemented a "give no quarter" initiative. This led to the further pursuit of the killing of the Sikh community in Punjab. Sikhs For Justice was banned in India in 2019 as an unlawful association. It began holding a referendum for creation of Khalistan in October 2021.

History

Legal proceedings against visiting Indian political leaders 
In 2011, Sikhs For Justice moved to the US court Kamal Nath and a few other leaders of Indian National Congress  for their alleged role in 1984 anti-Sikh riots, however, the court dismissed the case, saying that the case does not sufficiently "touch and concern" the US. In September 2013, the group filed an amended class action complaint against Sonia Gandhi for protecting members of her party who were involved in the 1984 anti-Sikh riots, but in June 2014, the case was dismissed due to lack of subject matter jurisdiction and failure to state a claim. SFJ were going to subpoena Rahul Gandhi as he stated 'some Congressmen were probably involved in 1984 anti-Sikh riots and they have been punished for it.

In February 2014, the group filed human rights violation case against then 13th Indian prime minister Dr. Manmohan Singh (a Sikh himself) for his role as finance minister of India in 1990s accusing him of "funding crimes against humanity perpetrated upon the Sikh community in India". They also submitted a report to United Nations Commission on Human Rights on 1984 anti-Sikh riots.

Khalistan referendum campaign 
SFJ started organizing a campaign for 'Referendum 2020' for secession of Punjab state from India. The first phase of the unofficial and non-binding referendum started from London on 31 October 2021. Gurpatwant Singh Pannun announced in November 2018 that the SFJ will establish a permanent office in Lahore for facilitating the registration of voters and giving information to Sikhs about it. He also stated that banners regarding the referendum and images of Jarnail Singh Bhindranwale had been posted around Nankana Sahib. The group also has at times expressed support for a greater Khalistan whose territory straddles parts of Punjab province of Pakistan and has invited non-Sikhs to register for voting.

Sukhpal Singh Khaira, MLA of Punjab Legislative Assembly and the Leader of Opposition at the time, said, "Sikh Referendum 2020 was a result of consistent policy of bias, discrimination and persecution towards the Sikhs by successive governments in India”, though he clarified that he did not support the referendum. Chief Minister of Punjab Amarinder Singh rebuked him. The Shiromani Akali Dal and the Bhartiya Janata Party also criticized Khaira for his statement, with former Punjab Deputy Chief Minister Sukhbir Singh Badal asking the AAP chief Arvind Kejriwal to act against the Punjab LoP. The Sikh delegation in the United States of America also met the Indian Prime Minister Narendra Modi during his visit in September 2019, to highlight their support of India as one country.

In October 2021 it held the first round of its referendum in London for those of Indian Sikh ethnicity above the age of 18, and announced plans to expand the voting to other cities of the United Kingdom. However only 2,000 people were reported to have taken part. In Switzerland, the referendum was held in Geneva in December 2021 with over 6,000 Sikhs reported to have taken part. It later started holding the referndum in Canada from May 2022, with the first phase taking place in Brescia. In July it organised the second phase in Rome. Over 57,000 Sikhs were reported to have taken part.

In June 2022 the group released a map for the proposed territory of Khalistan before the press in Lahore. Along with the Indian Punjab, it also included Haryana, Himachal Pradesh, and parts of Rajasthan, Uttar Pradesh and Uttarakhand. Pannun stated that Shimla would be the capital of the proposed nation, and requested the Government of Pakistan for assistance in its creation.

The referendum in Canada started being held from September 2022, with the first phase being held in Brampton. The second phase was held in Mississauga in November. Around 185,000 Sikhs were reported to have participated in both phases. In Australia, it was held in Canberra in January 2023. The vote led to clashes between pro-Khalistani and pro-Indian groups.

Intention behind Kartarpur Corridor 

Kartarpur Corridor, is a religious corridor that allows Indian worshipers to visit Gurdwaras. this initiative was backed by the Indian state to help the Sikh and Punjabi populations visit some of the most relevant places in Sikh history. The Corridor was also used by Sikhs for Justice for promoting the secessionist campaign 'Referendum 2020'. The campaign is backed by Pakistan which is a close ally of Khalistanis. Sikhs are able to travel to their shrine in Pakistan without a visa. The allowance of Sikhs to cross the border into Pakistan is seen as a political move to demonstrate that Pakistan is welcoming of other religions. The pilgrims using Kartarpur Corridor were urged to attend workshops and seminars in Kartarpur on Referendum 2020, arranged by Sikhs for Justice.

Criminal accusations

As of July 2019, there were 12 criminal cases that were being pursued by Indian agencies namely National Investigation Agency (NIA), Punjab Police and Uttarakhand Police who have also arrested 39 people associated with the SFJ in India. According to the former Chief Minister of Punjab, Captain Amarinder Singh, SFJ "had unleashed a wave of terror in Punjab in recent years" and deserved to be called a terrorist organisation. He welcomed the decision to ban the SFJ as a step towards protecting India from secessionist and anti-Indian plans of the organisation he described as backed by Pakistan's ISI.

A member of the group was arrested in Malaysia in September 2019 among others for allegedly planning to attack leaders of local parties. Also, out of the four terrorists arrested in Tarn Taran blast case in Punjab, one revealed that they were tasked to kill the leaders of various Deras in India by Sikhs for Justice. Furthermore, the Kartarpur Corridor that has been opened up for Sikhs, is reportedly being used for Khalistani propaganda by SFJ.

SFJ activist Jaswinder Singh Multani was detained and questioned in Germany in December 2021 for his alleged role in the Ludhiana blast case. In January 2022, the NIA registered a case against him for hatching a conspiracy against India. A purported audio message of Pannun claiming responsibility for the Mohali blast in May 2022 was released after the attack.

According to audio recordings of Pannun obtained by the Punjab Police from two SFJ members in July 2022, the group tried to arrange shelter for killers of singer Sidhu Moose Wala, planned to target Ambala Cantonment Junction railway station and Ambala City railway station and disrupt Independence Day celebrations in Delhi and Punjab. Pannun has been booked in 22 cases in Punjab from 2017 to 2022. India requested Interpol to issue a red notice against him in October 2022, but it rejected it.

A purported audio was released in December 2022 of the group claiming responsibility for the recent attack on a Tarn Taran police station. Pannun however later stated that the organisation only engaged in a peaceful struggle and would provide legal aid to the suspects who he said were falsely accused.

Banned in India 
Sikhs for Justice was banned on 10 July 2019, by Government of India under Unlawful Activities (Prevention) Act (UAPA) for anti-India activities. The group planned to use Google Play for spreading its propaganda, and an application was uploaded on it for people to register for Referendum 2020. The application was reported, and thereafter removed by Google Play Store in November 2019. Its Facebook page had already been blocked from India by the company in 2015.

Later in January 2020, the UAPA tribunal chaired by Delhi High Court Chief Justice D.N. Patel sustained the decision of ban on the secessionist group. Citing the evidences presented, as the reason for the decision, the committee said that since the activities of the group were "unlawful", "disruptive" and "threaten the sovereignty, unity and territorial integrity of India" and SFJ was "working in collusion with anti-India entities and forces", therefore, "the Central Government had sufficient cause to take action under UAPA for declaring Sikhs For Justice as an unlawful association."

On 1 July 2020, Gurpatwant Singh Pannun was declared as an "individual terrorist" under the UAPA for promoting secessionism and allegedly encouraging Punjabi Sikh youth to take up arms. The central government via an order of Ministry of Electronics and Information Technology on the recommendation of the Ministry of Home Affairs on July 5, banned 40 websites belonging to the group for attracting people to its cause.

References

Sikh organisations
Organizations based in the United States
Organizations established in 2007
Pro-Khalistan militant outfits
Organisations designated as terrorist by India
Internet censorship in India